Love Fantasy is a studio album by American musician Roy Ayers. It was released in 1980 through Polydor Records. Recording sessions for the album took place at Electric Lady Studios and Sigma Sound Studios in New York City.

Track listing

Personnel
Roy Ayers – lead vocals, electric piano (tracks: 1, 3-6), Quadra synthesizer (track 2), clavinet (track 3), Oberheim synthesizer (track 5), handclaps (track 6), producer
Dyan Venter – lead vocals (tracks: 1, 2)
Sylvia Striplin – lead vocals (tracks: 1, 4, 6)
Wes Ramseur – lead vocals (track 6)
Chano O'Ferral – lead vocals (track 6)
Chris Calloway – backing vocals (track 3)
Cindy Prioleau – backing vocals (track 3)
Chuck Anthony – guitar (tracks: 1, 3-6)
Peter Brown – bass (tracks: 1, 2, 4-6)
William Henry Allen – bass (track 3), arrangement
Omar Hakim – drums (tracks: 1, 4-6)
Quentin Dennard – drums (track 2)
Bernard Lee "Pretty" Purdie – drums (track 3)
Technical
David Wittman – engineering
Carla Bandini – engineering
Greg Calbi – mastering
Judy Weinstein – liner notes

Charts

References

External links 

1980 albums
Roy Ayers albums
Polydor Records albums
Albums recorded at Electric Lady Studios
Albums recorded at Sigma Sound Studios
Albums produced by Roy Ayers